The 2015 WNBA season was the 19th season of the Women's National Basketball Association (WNBA). The regular season started on June 5 and playoffs concluded on October 14.

The Minnesota Lynx beat the Indiana Fever 69–52 in game five of the Finals on October 14 to clinch a third WNBA title in five years.

TV and Internet coverage 
Games aired on ESPN (1 regular season game), ESPN2 (10 regular season games), ABC (All-Star Game) and NBA TV (47 regular season games).

Notable occurrences 
 On February 3, 2015, the Phoenix Mercury announced that superstar Diana Taurasi would not play in 2015. Her Russian club team, UMMC Ekaterinburg, offered her more than her WNBA season salary to rest during the 2015 WNBA season. Some in the league feared this would cause more star players to reach similar agreements.
 On June 4, 2015, Tulsa player Glory Johnson announced that she is pregnant and would miss all of the 2015 WNBA season.
On July 23, 2015, The WNBA approved the relocation of the Tulsa Shock to Dallas-Fort Worth. The move is the first franchise relocation or fold since the 2009 Sacramento Monarchs folded, and the Detroit Shock moved to Tulsa. At the time, the Shock were the only WNBA franchise to relocate twice.
On October 14, 2015, The Minnesota Lynx won their third WNBA title in five years, beating the Indiana Fever 3-2.
On November 4, 2015, shortly after the 2015 season concluded, WNBA President Laurel Richie announced her resignation, effective November 9, 2015. She was the league's 3rd president.

2015 WNBA draft

On August 21, 2014, the 2015 WNBA Draft Lottery took place. The Seattle Storm, who had a league-worst record of 12–22 last season, won the draft lottery and had the right to pick first in the 2015 draft. In the draft, held on April 16, the Storm made Jewell Loyd of Notre Dame the top pick.

Team standings
Source:
Eastern Conference

Western Conference

Playoffs

Season award winners

Player of the Week award

Player of the Month award

Rookie of the Month award

Postseason awards

Coaches

Eastern Conference
Atlanta Dream: Michael Cooper
Chicago Sky: Pokey Chatman
Connecticut Sun: Anne Donovan
Indiana Fever: Stephanie White
New York Liberty: Bill Laimbeer
Washington Mystics: Mike Thibault

Western Conference
Los Angeles Sparks: Brian Agler
Minnesota Lynx: Cheryl Reeve
Phoenix Mercury: Sandy Brondello
San Antonio Silver Stars: Dan Hughes
Seattle Storm: Jenny Boucek
Tulsa Shock: Fred Williams

References

External links
2015 WNBA Schedule and Results - Women's National Basketball Association - ESPN
Official Site

 
2015 in American women's basketball
2014–15 in American basketball by league
2015–16 in American basketball by league
Women's National Basketball Association seasons